

414001–414100 

|-id=026
| 414026 Bochonko ||  || Richard Bochonko (1941–2014), a professor of mathematics, physics and astronomy at the University of Manitoba. || 
|}

414101–414200 

|-bgcolor=#f2f2f2
| colspan=4 align=center | 
|}

414201–414300 

|-bgcolor=#f2f2f2
| colspan=4 align=center | 
|}

414301–414400 

|-bgcolor=#f2f2f2
| colspan=4 align=center | 
|}

414401–414500 

|-bgcolor=#f2f2f2
| colspan=4 align=center | 
|}

414501–414600 

|-bgcolor=#f2f2f2
| colspan=4 align=center | 
|}

414601–414700 

|-bgcolor=#f2f2f2
| colspan=4 align=center | 
|}

414701–414800 

|-bgcolor=#f2f2f2
| colspan=4 align=center | 
|}

414801–414900 

|-bgcolor=#f2f2f2
| colspan=4 align=center | 
|}

414901–415000 

|-bgcolor=#f2f2f2
| colspan=4 align=center | 
|}

References 

414001-415000